Joking Apart is a BBC Television sitcom. The show was produced by Andre Ptaszynski for the independent production company Pola Jones and screened on BBC Two. All twelve episodes from the two series were written by Steven Moffat and directed by Bob Spiers. The pilot was transmitted as part of its Comic Asides series of pilot shows on 12 July 1991. The first episode of the series was transmitted on 7 January 1993, and the final transmitted on 7 February 1995.

The show is about the rise and fall of a relationship, juxtaposing a couple, Mark (Robert Bathurst) and Becky (Fiona Gillies), who meet and fall in love before getting separated and finally divorced. The show is semi-autobiographical; it was inspired by the then-recent separation of Moffat and his first wife. Some of the first series followed a non-linear dual structure, contrasting the rise of the relationship with the separation. Other episodes were ensemble farces, predominantly including the couple's friends Robert (Paul Raffield) and Tracy (Tracie Bennett). Paul Mark Elliott also appeared as Trevor, Becky's lover.

Scheduling problems led to low viewing figures. However, it scored highly on the Appreciation Index and accrued a loyal fanbase. One fan acquired the home video rights from the BBC and released both series on his own DVD label.

Series overview

Episodes

Pilot (1991)
The pilot, directed by John Kilby, was filmed at Pebble Mill in Birmingham on 9–10 August 1990. It was transmitted on BBC2 as part of its Comic Asides series of pilot shows on 12 July 1991. It is included on the bonus disc on the second series DVD release.

The stand-up sequences were shot against a black background. Although this made it clearer that they were not "real", Moffat thought that it looked odd, and "hell to look at". The same script used for the pilot, with minor changes, was reshot by Bob Spiers for the first episode of the series proper. Some footage, such as Mark and Becky's first meeting at the funeral, leading to episode one's shared director credit between Spiers and Kilby.

Series 1 (1993)
The first series has been broadcast twice on BBC Two, first in early 1993. It was repeated in early spring 1994 to lead directly into the transmission of the second series, which was scheduled to be broadcast from June 1994.

Series 2 (1995)
The format was changed for this series, with the dual timelines and much of the flashbacks dropped for a more linear narrative. Moffat felt that the relationship had already been sufficiently established in the first series so there was little point going back to the start.

Robert and Tracy are given more stories than in the first series. Their main story arc begins in the third episode when Robert is caught by all of the main characters and his parents in a maid's outfit being spanked by a prostitute. The couple temporarily separate while Robert experiments with cross-dressing, but they are reunited by the end of the series.

References

External links 

 Joking Apart Unofficial Site, with episode guides and extended interviews with Moffat and Bathurst
 

Joking Apart episodes
Joking Apart episodes